Georg Vetter (born 26 April 1962 in Vienna) is an Austrian business lawyer, author and former politician at Team Stronach and Austrian People's Party (ÖVP).

Biography 
Georg Vetter studied law and economics in Vienna and Texas. He has been working as a lawyer since 1991.

Vetter was a member of the Team Stronach and moved to the Austrian National Council in October 2013, where he was promoted to deputy chairman of the Parliamentary club. In June 2015, his move to the parliamentary club of the Austrian People's Party (ÖVP) was announced.

In 2017 he was a member of the second Eurofighter committee of inquiry, which inspired him to write his book "Eurofighter 2017. Die Täuschung der Republik". In November of the same year Vetter resigned from the National Council.

Georg Vetter is a board member of the Hayek Institute and President of the Club of Independent Liberals.

Books 
 Die neue Macht der Aktionäre. Der Weg zur Aktionärsdemokratie. Ibera, Wien 2005. 
 Die daungegradete Republik: Das heutige Österreich aus der Sicht des Feldmarschalls Daun. Ibera, Wien 2011. 
 Eurofighter 2017. Die Täuschung der Republik. Ibera, Wien 2017,

Links

References 

1962 births
Living people
Members of the National Council (Austria)
Austrian People's Party politicians